Günther Rall (10 March 1918 – 4 October 2009) was a highly decorated German military aviator, officer and General, whose military career spanned nearly forty years. Rall was the third most successful fighter pilot in aviation history, behind Gerhard Barkhorn, who is second, and Erich Hartmann, who is first.

List of aerial victories claimed 
According to US historian David T. Zabecki, Rall was credited with 275 aerial victories. Spick also lists Rall with 275 aerial victories claimed in 621 combat missions. Of these, three were claimed over the Western Allies and the remaining 272 on the Eastern Front. Mathews and Foreman, authors of Luftwaffe Aces — Biographies and Victory Claims, researched the German Federal Archives and found records for 274 aerial victory claims, plus one further unconfirmed claim. This number includes one victory over a French Curtiss P-36 Hawk, one victory over a U.S. Lockheed P-38 Lightning, and 272 Soviet-piloted aircraft on the Eastern Front.

Victory claims were logged to a map-reference (PQ = Planquadrat), for example "PQ 44621". These sectors were then subdivided into 36 smaller units to give a location area 3 × 4 km in size.

Notes

References

Citations

Bibliography

 
 
 
 
 
 
 
 
 
 

Aerial victories of Rall, Günther
Rall, Günther
Aviation in World War II